The Society of International Photographers (SIP) is a not-for-profit organisation that was founded in 1936 with the express aim of lauding the most creative photographers of the time. Over the years this has grown to include a monthly and yearly competition.

Information
Early members of the SIP include Man Ray and Henri Cartier-Bresson. Recent recipients of the annual award include Gary Pavkovich (2008) and Angela Prabhu (2011). The first competition was launched in 2008, prizes include photographic equipment and international holidays. 

The SIP accepts professional and non-professional members and competition entrants, and allows digital art, thus tacitly allowing digital manipulation of photographs, commonly known as photoshopping.

References
 Wignall, Jef, ed. "Winning Digital Photo Contests" Lark, 2009. .
 Steve Donovan, ed. "The World's Biggest Book of Photography Competitions, Awards, Grants and Places To Sell Your Photos Online" Theworldsbiggestbooks.com, 2008. .

External links
Official Website

Photography organizations